Lasocin may refer to the following places:
Lasocin, Łódź Voivodeship (central Poland)
Lasocin, Lublin Voivodeship (east Poland)
Lasocin, Kielce County in Świętokrzyskie Voivodeship (south-central Poland)
Lasocin, Opatów County in Świętokrzyskie Voivodeship (south-central Poland)
Lasocin, Płock County in Masovian Voivodeship (east-central Poland)
Lasocin, Sochaczew County in Masovian Voivodeship (east-central Poland)
Lasocin, Lubusz Voivodeship (west Poland)
Lasocin, West Pomeranian Voivodeship (north-west Poland)